In The Flesh was a series of worldwide concert tours by Roger Waters that spanned three individual tours over the course of three years (1999, 2000, and 2002). Returning from a 12-year-long hiatus from the road, In The Flesh was a showcase of his best known work from his days with Pink Floyd, with that material dominating shows. Songs were also performed from Waters' most recently released solo album, 1992's Amused to Death, being played live for the first time. The tour's name is an allusion to the 1977 Pink Floyd tour for the Animals album, as well as the two songs so titled on the album The Wall.

The tour was a financial success in the United States. Because of Waters' long absence from the music scene, promoters and other industry figures were unsure of how well a Waters tour would do commercially, and were surprised when tickets began selling rapidly as soon as the were put on sale. In a number of cases, dates booked in smaller venues such as theatres were moved into larger ones such as outdoor amphitheatres or arenas. The 1999 portion of the tour ended up grossing $6.7 million from 21 shows, with a total of some 243,000 people attending.

Although Waters himself had no new music being released in conjunction with In the Flesh, the 2000 portion of the tour coincided with the release of Is There Anybody Out There? The Wall Live 1980–81, commemorating Pink Floyd's historic live performance of The Wall, and the tour and the release were cross-promoted.  While the first two years of the tour took place only in North America, the third year stretched across the world. During the tour, Waters played two completely new songs, "Flickering Flame" or "Each Small Candle", often as the final encore to many of the shows. In June 2002, he completed the tour with a performance in front of 70,000 people at the Glastonbury Festival of Performing Arts.

The 27 June 2000 performance at the Rose Garden Arena (Now Moda Center) in Portland, Oregon was later released as the primary source for the CD and DVD In the Flesh – Live. Several other shows were filmed as well for use in the CD/DVD, with announcements being made alerting audience members that they were being filmed.

1999 

The concert show consisted of his most famous tracks from the beginning of his Pink Floyd career. Along with the popular acclaim, the show received critical praise from various artists and magazines.  Most of the tour band had worked with Waters before, although guitarist Doyle Bramhall II was new.

 Tour band
 Roger Waters – guitar, bass guitar, vocals
 Andy Fairweather Low – guitar, bass guitar, vocals (has toured and recorded with George Harrison, The Who, Who member Pete Townshend, and Eric Clapton).
 Snowy White – guitars (former member of Thin Lizzy, played with Pink Floyd in 1977 and 1980).
 Doyle Bramhall II – vocals, guitar (worked with Eric Clapton)
 Graham Broad – drums, percussion (part of former Rolling Stones member Bill Wyman's band The Rhythm Kings).
 Jon Carin – keyboards, lap steel guitar, vocals, acoustic guitar on "Dogs" (toured with post-Waters Pink Floyd, Roxy Music front man Bryan Ferry, and The Who).
 Andy Wallace – keyboards, backing vocals (has performed and recorded with several artists including Hamish Stuart, David Bowie, Daryl Hall, Tom Jones and Whitney Houston.)
 P. P. Arnold – backing vocals, percussion (former backing band member for Ike and Tina Turner.)
 Katie Kissoon – backing vocals, percussion (backed the likes of Elton John, Eric Clapton, Van Morrison, and many others).
 Susannah Melvoin - backing vocals, percussion (has toured with Prince)
Source: 

 Set list
Set 1
 "In the Flesh"
 "The Thin Ice"
 "Another Brick in the Wall, Part 1"
 "The Happiest Days of Our Lives"
 "Another Brick in the Wall, Part 2" (Prior to 31 July 1999, "Happiest Days" and "Another Brick, Part 2" were played at the end of set two after "Amused to Death")
 "Mother"
 "Get Your Filthy Hands Off My Desert"
 "Southampton Dock"
 "Pigs on the Wing, Part 1"
 "Dogs"
 "Welcome to the Machine"
 "Wish You Were Here"
 "Shine On You Crazy Diamond, Parts I–VII"

Set 2
 "Speak to Me"
 "Breathe"
 "Time"
 "The Great Gig in the Sky" (piano intro only, dropped prior to 15 August 1999)
 "Money"
 "5:06AM (Every Strangers' Eyes)"
 "The Powers That Be"
 "What God Wants, Part I"
 "Perfect Sense, Part I"
 "Perfect Sense, Part II"
 "It's a Miracle"
 "Amused to Death"

Encore
 "Brain Damage"
 "Eclipse"
 "Comfortably Numb"

2000 

Following the startling success of the 1999 tour, Waters mounted an even more extensive tour, touching areas of the country ignored on previous tours.  The set list was also altered with "The Thin Ice", "Another Brick In The Wall part 1", "The Powers That Be" and "What God Wants" being removed in favour of "Set the Controls for the Heart of the Sun", "Bravery of Being Out of Range" and new song titled "Each Small Candle". The backing band was relatively the same as the previous tour, with an addition of a backup singer and a new saxophone player for the songs "Set the Controls for the Heart of the Sun" and "Money".

 Tour band
 Roger Waters – guitar, bass guitar, vocals
 Andy Fairweather Low – guitar, bass guitar, vocals (has toured and recorded with George Harrison, The Who, Who member Pete Townshend, and Eric Clapton).
 Snowy White – guitars (former member of Thin Lizzy, played with Pink Floyd in 1977 and 1980).
 Doyle Bramhall II – vocals, guitar (worked with Eric Clapton)
 Graham Broad – drums, percussion (part of former Rolling Stones member Bill Wyman's band The Rhythm Kings).
 Jon Carin – keyboards, lap steel guitar, vocals, acoustic guitar on "Dogs" (toured with post-Waters Pink Floyd, Roxy Music front man Bryan Ferry, and The Who).
 Andy Wallace – keyboards, backing vocals (has performed and recorded with several artists including Hamish Stuart, David Bowie, Daryl Hall, Tom Jones and Whitney Houston.)
 P. P. Arnold – backing vocals, percussion (former backing band member for Ike and Tina Turner.)
 Katie Kissoon – backing vocals, percussion (backed the likes of Elton John, Eric Clapton, Van Morrison, and many others).
 Susannah Melvoin - backing vocals, percussion (has toured with Prince)
Source:

 Guest musicians
 Mike MacArthur: saxophone on 2 June
 Ed Calle: saxophone on 3 June
 Wayne Jackson: trumpet on 6 June
 Andrew Love: saxophone on 6 June
 Tim Gordon: saxophone on 7 June
 Shelley Carroll: saxophone on the 10-11–13 June
 Don Menza: saxophone on the 16-17–19 June
 Steve Tavaglione: saxophone on the 21-22–24 June
 Norbert Stachel: saxophone for 25 & 27 June Rose Garden, Portland show (as documented on the In the Flesh – Live DVD)
 Eric Walton: saxophone on 30 June & 1 July
 Mark Harris: saxophone on 3 July
 Steve Eisen: saxophone on 6 July
 Mel Collins: saxophone for the last 6 dates* (toured with Waters on The Pros and Cons of Hitch Hiking and Radio Kaos tours)

 Set list
Set 1
 "In the Flesh"
 "The Happiest Days of Our Lives"
 "Another Brick in the Wall, Part 2"
 "Mother"
 "Get Your Filthy Hand Off My Desert"
 "Southampton Dock"
 "Pigs on the Wing, Part 1"
 "Dogs"
 "Welcome to the Machine"
 "Wish You Were Here"
 "Shine On You Crazy Diamond, Parts I–VII"

Set 2
 "Set the Controls for the Heart of the Sun"
 "Breathe"
 "Time"
 "Money"
 "5:06AM (Every Strangers Eyes)"
 "What God Wants, Part I" (dropped after 2 June 2000)
 "Perfect Sense, Part I"
 "Perfect Sense, Part II"
 "The Bravery of Being Out of Range"
 "It's a Miracle"
 "Amused to Death"
 "Brain Damage"
 "Eclipse"

Encore
 "Comfortably Numb"
 "Each Small Candle"

Notes
  The Rose Garden show in Portland, Oregon was both filmed and recorded and subsequently released as a DVD and double CD titled In the Flesh – Live.

2002 

The success of Waters' two American tours encouraged him to make his 2002 tour a world tour. The set list for 2002 was similar to the previous tour with the addition of another new song, "Flickering Flame", which was substituted periodically for "Each Small Candle" as the encore. The band also changed with the departure of Doyle Bramhall II, his wife and back up singer Sussanah Melvoin and Jon Carin. Brought in was Chester Kamen who replacing Bramhall on guitars and vocals as well as Carin's vocals, Linda Lewis as back up singer (who later was replaced by Carol Kenyon due to personal issues), and Harry Waters (son of frontman Roger Waters) to replace Carin on keyboards and occasional guitar.  By far the most historical moment of this or any of Waters in the Flesh tours came at London's Wembley Arena as former Pink Floyd bandmate and drummer Nick Mason sat in and played both nights on "Set the Controls for the Heart of the Sun".

 Tour band
 Roger Waters – guitar, bass guitar, vocals
 Andy Fairweather Low – guitar, bass guitar, vocals (has toured and recorded with George Harrison, The Who, Who member Pete Townshend, and Eric Clapton).
 Snowy White – guitars (former member of Thin Lizzy, played with Pink Floyd in 1977 and 1980).
 Chester Kamen – vocals, guitar (Played with David Gilmour and Bryan Ferry at Live aid)
 Graham Broad – drums, percussion (part of former Rolling Stones member Bill Wyman's band The Rhythm Kings).
 Harry Waters – keyboards, acoustic guitar on "Comfortably Numb" (Waters' Son and Jazz Hammond organist and pianist
 Andy Wallace – keyboards, backing vocals (has performed and recorded with several artists including Hamish Stuart, David Bowie, Daryl Hall, Tom Jones and Whitney Houston.)
 P. P. Arnold – backing vocals, percussion (former backing band member for Ike and Tina Turner.)
 Katie Kissoon – backing vocals, percussion (backed the likes of Elton John, Eric Clapton, Van Morrison, and many others).
 Linda Lewis – (first leg) backing vocals, percussion (provided vocals for David Bowie, Al Kooper, Cat Stevens, Steve Harley and Cockney Rebel, Rick Wakeman & Rod Stewart)
 Carol Kenyon – (second leg) backing vocals, percussion (sung with Go West, Duran Duran, Kylie Minogue, Mike Oldfield, Jon and Vangelis and The Pet Shop Boys as well as post Waters' Pink Floyd)
 Norbert Stachel: saxophone, penny whistle 

 Set list
Set 1
 "In The Flesh"
 "The Happiest Days of Our Lives"
 "Another Brick in the Wall, Part 2"
 "Mother"
 "Get Your Filthy Hand Off My Desert"
 "Southampton Dock"
 "Pigs on the Wing, Part 1"
 "Dogs"
 "Set the Controls for the Heart of the Sun" (moved midtour, originally opened set two)
 "Shine On You Crazy Diamond, Parts I–V"
 "Welcome to the Machine"
 "Wish You Were Here"
 "Shine On You Crazy Diamond, Parts VI–VII" (On 7 June and 24 June 2002 the full "Shine On You Crazy Diamond, Parts VI–IX" was played instead)

Set 2
 "Breathe"
 "Time"
 "Money"
 "5:06AM (Every Strangers Eyes)"
 "Perfect Sense, Part I"
 "Perfect Sense, Part II"
 "The Bravery of Being Out of Range"
 "It's a Miracle"
 "Amused to Death"
 "Brain Damage"
 "Eclipse"

Encore
 "Comfortably Numb"
 "Each Small Candle" or "Flickering Flame" (On certain dates, such as 17 March 2002, among others, both "Each Small Candle" and "Flickering Flame" were performed)

  * Nick Mason's guest-drumming appearances during "Set the Controls for the Heart of the Sun".
  ** Indicates when "Each Small Candle" was substituted for "Flickering Flame" during the encore

References

External links 
 

1999 concert tours
2000 concert tours
2002 concert tours
Roger Waters concert tours